Valley Power Plant is an intermediate load, natural gas fired, electrical power station located in Milwaukee, Wisconsin. It is owned by We Energies. The plant is a cogeneration facility supplying steam to 480 customers and 280 MW of electricity.

The plant was originally fueled by a pulverized coal and petroleum coke blend. Coal was shipped by boat to Milwaukee's Greenfield Avenue dock and then by barge to the plant. The plant completed its conversion to natural gas in late 2015.

Units

See also
List of power stations in Wisconsin

References

External links
Valley Power Plant conversion
https://www.we-energies.com/company/pdf/ValleyPP.pdf

Energy infrastructure completed in 1968
Energy infrastructure completed in 1969
Buildings and structures in Milwaukee
Natural gas-fired power stations in Wisconsin